Shea Ryan Langeliers (born November 18, 1997) is an American professional baseball catcher for the Oakland Athletics of Major League Baseball (MLB). He made his MLB debut in 2022. He played college baseball for the Baylor Bears.

Amateur career
Langeliers attended Keller High School in Keller, Texas. He began catching as a high school sophomore. As a senior in 2016, Langeliers batted .369 with six home runs and 31 RBIs. He was drafted by the Toronto Blue Jays in the 34th round of the 2016 Major League Baseball draft, but did not sign and instead chose to attend Baylor University to play college baseball for the Baylor Bears.

As a freshman at Baylor in 2017, Langeliers batted .313 with ten home runs and 38 RBIs in 55 games. He was a unanimous selection to the All-Big 12 Freshman Team as well as being named to the All-Big 12 Second Team. He spent that summer playing in the Cape Cod Baseball League for the Chatham Anglers where he was named an All-Star. In 2018, as a sophomore, Langeliers missed time at the beginning of the season due to a wrist injury. However, he returned, and finished the year batting .252 with 11 home runs and 44 RBIs in 58 games. He was named to the All-Big 12 First Team along with winning a Rawlings/ABCA Division I Gold Glove, becoming only the second player in Baylor history to win the award. Langeliers played for the USA Baseball Collegiate National Team that summer. In 2019, his junior season, he was named to the All-Big 12 First Team for the second consecutive year despite missing three weeks due to a broken hand. In an elimination game during the 2019 NCAA Division I baseball tournament, he hit three home runs and had 11 RBIs in Baylor's 24–6 win over Nebraska-Omaha. Langeliers finished his junior year hitting .308 with ten home runs and 42 RBIs in 44 games.

Professional career

Atlanta Braves
Langeliers was considered one of the top prospects for the 2019 Major League Baseball draft. He was selected by the Atlanta Braves with the ninth overall pick. He signed with the team for $4 million. He began his professional career with the Rome Braves of the Class A South Atlantic League, spending all of the 2019 season there. Over 54 games, Langeliers hit .255/.310/.343 with two home runs and 34 RBIs.

Langeliers did not play a minor league game in 2020 due to the cancellation of the minor league season caused by the COVID-19 pandemic. In 2021, he spent a majority of the season with the Mississippi Braves of the Double-A South, slashing .258/.338/.498 with 22 home runs and 52 RBIs over 92 games. Following the end of Mississippi's season, he joined the Gwinnett Stripers of the Triple-A West for their final homestand. He was named Atlanta's Minor League Player of the Year. He was selected to play in the Arizona Fall League for the Peoria Javelinas after the season.

Oakland Athletics
On March 14, 2022, the Braves traded Langeliers, Cristian Pache, Ryan Cusick, and Joey Estes to the Oakland Athletics in exchange for Matt Olson. He was assigned to the Las Vegas Aviators of the Triple-A Pacific Coast League to begin the 2022 season. He was selected to represent the Athletics at the 2022 All-Star Futures Game. He hit a solo home run and was named the game's most valuable player.

On August 16, 2022, Langeliers was promoted to the major league roster. He made his MLB debut that night versus the Texas Rangers, and collected his first major league hit that night, a double, on the first pitch of his first at-bat. He hit his first MLB home run the next night, a two-run home run, off of Josh Sborz of the Rangers.

Personal life
Langeliers majored in engineering while at Baylor.

References

External links

Baylor Bears bio

1997 births
Living people
People from Keller, Texas
Baseball players from Portland, Oregon
Baseball players from Texas
Major League Baseball catchers
Oakland Athletics players
Baylor Bears baseball players
Chatham Anglers players
United States national baseball team players
Rome Braves players
Mississippi Braves players
Gwinnett Stripers players
Peoria Javelinas players
Las Vegas Aviators players